Xyliatos is a village in the Nicosia District of Cyprus, located 4 km southwest of Agia Marina.

References

Communities in Nicosia District